La Gira Dura was a concert tour by Puerto Rican artist Daddy Yankee. The tour name references his 2018 hit Dura. 

During this tour, he performed in London at the SSE Arena. It was his first concert in the United Kingdom. Also, the tour had his first concerts in Albania and in China, becoming the first reggaeton artist ever to perform in those countries. In Argentina, the media reported that the attendance of both concerts was about 40,000 fans.

Tour dates

Notes

References 

Concert tours of Canada
Concert tours of Mexico
Concert tours of the United States
Concert tours of South America
Concert tours of Europe
Concert tours of Asia
Daddy Yankee concert tours
2018 concert tours